The Delhi Football League is a ladder-based state football competition organised by Football Delhi (FD), involving a total of five divisions with over 80 teams in the Indian state of Delhi. Delhi Premier League is the top-division, started in 1948 as DSA Senior Division.

History
The first parent body of Delhi football was formed in 1926, with professor Mohammed Zubair Qureishi as secretary. There was no proper local league but the clubs used to participate in private tournaments organised by sport enthusiasts.
Due to the violence and upheaval caused by the Partition of India, the Delhi League was suspended after 1946. It resumed in 1948 and the oldest club in the capital Young Men has won it that year. From 1948 onwards, the Delhi League took a particular shape. It had three divisions. The top 10 teams played in the A division, on a double-leg basis, with all matches being held at the Ambedkar Stadium, earlier known as the Delhi Gate Stadium. The B and C division matches took place at either the nearby Crescent Ground or the President's Estate Ground. Except for transport allowance, kit and refreshment, there was no payment to the players. However, club officials would strive to get their top players jobs in leading public sector concerns like Delhi Audit, Northern Railway, State Bank of India, Central Secretariat Service, Delhi Electric Supply Undertaking (DESU), Food Corporation of India (FCI) and so on. A competitive institutional league was also held annually.

Competition structure

Delhi Premier LeagueDelhi Premier League', previously known as Football Delhi Senior Division League (FD Senior Division) and DSA Senior Division'', is the top state-level football league in Delhi and level 4 of Indian football league system. It is also the highest level inter-city league played in the capital. Competition is conducted by Football Delhi, official governing body of Delhi region under AIFF. Most players from this league are selected to represent Delhi for Santosh Trophy.

Teams

FD Senior Division League
Football Delhi Senior Division League is the second tier of Delhi Football League system.

A-Division League
Football Delhi A-Division is the third tier of Delhi Football League system.

B-Division League
Football Delhi B-Division is the fourth tier of Delhi Football League system.

Teams

C-Division League
Football Delhi C-Division is the fifth tier of Delhi Football League system.

Teams

Venues
The most of league matches are played at Ambedkar Stadium or Jawaharlal Nehru Sports Complex, both of which are located in New Delhi.

Top division results by year
The Delhi League was started in 1948, but has not been finished on some occasions. From 1985, a new format, Super League (two groups followed by knock-out semifinals and final), was adopted.

See also
Football Delhi

References

External links
  (Football Delhi official)

4
Football in Delhi